The women's freestyle 60 kilograms is a competition featured at the 2015 World Wrestling Championships, and was held in Las Vegas, United States on 11 September 2015.

This freestyle wrestling competition consisted of a single-elimination tournament, with a repechage used to determine the winners of two bronze medals. The two finalists faced off for gold and silver medals. Each wrestler who lost to one of the two finalists moved into the repechage, culminating in a pair of bronze medal matches featuring the semifinal losers each facing the remaining repechage opponent from their half of the bracket.

Each bout consists of a single round within a six-minute limit including two halves of three minutes. The wrestler who scores more points is the winner.

The Ukrainian Oksana Herhel won the gold medal after beating Sükheegiin Tserenchimed from Mongolia in the final 10–7. Dzhanan Manolova of Bulgaria and Leigh Jaynes from the United States shared the bronze medals. Manolova beat Sun of China 3–1 and Jaynes beat Netreba from Azerbaijan 4–4 on criteria.

Results
Legend
F — Won by fall

Main bracket

Repechage

References

Results book

External links
Official website

Women's Freestyle 60 kg
World